An antanagoge (Greek ἀνταναγωγή, a leading or bringing up), is a figure in rhetoric, in which, not being able to answer the accusation of an adversary, a person instead makes a counter-allegation or counteracting an opponent’s proposal with an opposing proposition in one's own speech or writing.

Antanagoge places a negative point next to and/or in between a positive point, in attempt to redirect attention away from the negative point. 

It may also refer to placing a positive outlook on a situation that has a negative connotation, such as in the following examples:

Literary Examples
"When life gives you lemons, make lemonade."
"I got in a car accident, but I was planning on getting a new car anyway."
"Many are the pains and perils to be passed,
 But great is the gain and glory at the last."

See also

References

Figures of speech